European Confederation may refer to:

European Confederation (1943), a proposal by German Foreign Minister Joachim von Ribbentrop in March 1943
European Confederation (1989), a proposal by French President François Mitterrand in December 1989